Edward Blood (August 15, 1908 – June 13, 1991) was an American skier. He competed in the Nordic combined events at the 1932 Winter Olympics and the 1936 Winter Olympics.

References

External links
 

1908 births
1991 deaths
American male Nordic combined skiers
Olympic Nordic combined skiers of the United States
Nordic combined skiers at the 1932 Winter Olympics
Nordic combined skiers at the 1936 Winter Olympics
People from Bradford, Vermont